HMS Rowena was an  destroyer which served with the Royal Navy during World War I. Launched on 1 July 1916, the ship operated as part of the Grand Fleet as part of a destroyer flotilla hunting for German vessels that were attacking convoys in the North Sea. Although there were many reported sightings, no submarines were sunk. After the conflict, the vessel was transferred to the Navy’s establishment at Portland to help in the development of anti-submarine warfare, which ultimately helped in the Battle of the Atlantic. Rowena did not, however, see the fruit of this labour. After twenty years of service, the destroyer was retired and sold to be broken up on 27 January 1937.

Design and development

Rowena was the second  destroyer ordered by the British Admiralty in July 1915 as part of the Sixth War Construction Programme. A development of the preceding , the design differed primarily in utilising geared turbines to improve fuel consumption.

Three funnels were fitted.

Armament consisted of three  Mk IV QF guns on the ship's centreline, with one on the forecastle, one aft on a raised platform and one between the second and third funnels. A single 2-pounder (40 mm) pom-pom anti-aircraft gun was carried, while torpedo armament consisted of two twin rotating mounts for  torpedoes.  The ship had a complement of 82 officers and ratings.

Construction and career
Rowena was laid down by John Brown & Company at Clydebank on the River Clyde on 25 August 1915 and launched on 1 July 1916, leaving the yard on 29 September that year. The destroyer was allocated the yard number 450. The build took 310 days and fitting out 90 days.

On commissioning, Rowena joined the 15th Destroyer Flotilla of the Grand Fleet, and served there until 1919. The Flotilla was involved in supporting the convoys that crossed the North Sea, including running anti-submarine patrols between 15 and 24 June 1917. Although sixty-one sightings of submarines and twelve attacks were reported during that operation, no submarines were sunk. On 24 April 1918 the Flotilla was called to intercept the High Seas Fleet on what was to prove the last major expedition of the war by the German Navy. The ships returned without making contact.

In May 1919, the Rowena sailed from Ostend to the Admiralty Pier in Dover, to repatriate the remains of Edith Cavell - the British nurse executed by the German Army in 1915.

After the war, Rowena was sent to Gibraltar with her sister ship , arriving on 8 May 1920. The vessel joined the Anti-Submarine Flotilla in Portland on 1 July 1926. For the next ten years, Rowena was used to refine anti-submarine weapons and techniques such as ASDIC. ASDIC went on to prove invaluable in the Battle of the Atlantic. On 27 January 1937, the destroyer was given to Thos. W. Ward of Sheffield in exchange for RMS Majestic, and was subsequently broken up at Milford Haven.

Pennant numbers

References

Citations

Bibliography

 
 
 
 
 
 

 
 
 

1916 ships
Ships built on the River Clyde
R-class destroyers (1916)
World War I destroyers of the United Kingdom